is a park in Tama-ku, Kawasaki, Kanagawa Prefecture, Japan. 

Among other features, it has an observation platform at the top of Mt. Masugata, the Japan Open-Air Folk Museum with authentic traditional houses, the Kawasaki Municipal Science Museum with a planetarium, the Taro Okamoto Museum of Art, a traditional craft center, and a large rose garden open to the public in the spring and autumn.

The entrance is a fifteen-minute walk from Mukōgaoka-Yūen Station on the Odakyu Odawara Line.

Fauna

Animals
 Japanese raccoon dog

Wild birds
The park contains a bird reserve and a wide variety of birds can be seen in the park.
 Eurasian tree sparrow
 Japanese tit
 Japanese bush warbler
 Japanese white-eye
 Varied tit
 Long-tailed tit
 Japanese pygmy woodpecker
 White-cheeked starling
 Brown-eared bulbul
 Oriental turtle dove
 Azure-winged magpie
 Common kingfisher
 Jungle crow
 Carrion crow

Winter birds
 Hawfinch
 Dusky thrush
 Red-flanked bluetail
 Eurasian jay

Summer birds
 Black-faced bunting

External links
Ikuta Ryokuchi Park (in English/Japanese)
Kawasaki City Nihon Minka-en (in English/Japanese)
Ikuta Green Park (old page in English)
Taro Okamoto Museum of Art

Parks in Japan
Kawasaki, Kanagawa
Parks and gardens in Kanagawa Prefecture